Khamla Pinkeo (born 23 November 1990) is a Laotian footballer. He made his first appearance for the Laos national football team in 2010.And for the first time being a coach of Champasak in Lao League 1 in 2022

References 

1990 births
Living people
Laotian footballers
Laos international footballers
Footballers at the 2014 Asian Games
Association football defenders
Asian Games competitors for Laos